Pingshu or pinghua refers to the traditional Han Chinese performing art of storytelling with no musical accompaniment. It is better known as pingshu in northern China and pinghua in southern China.

Performing art
Pingshu was extremely popular in the 1980s, when the Chinese people were able to afford radios, through which many of such radio drama programs were transmitted to every household.  People, young and old, would stick to the radio when they had the time, listening to these storytellings, many of which originated from ancient Chinese history.  In the countryside, farmers would take radios to their fields and listen to the stories while they were working.  In cities, old men would sit in a comfortable bamboo chair enjoying the stories while sipping tea. Many stories such as General Yue Fei, the Romance of the Three Kingdoms, Cavalier with White Eyebrows, and Romance of the Sui and Tang Dynasties gained popularity among young and old and became major topics of conversation. Famous storytellers or Pingshu performers such as Shan Tianfang (1934-2018), Yuan Kuocheng (1929-2015), Tian Lianyuan (born 1941), and Liu Lanfang (born 1944) consequently became well-known.

Pingshu performers often wear gowns and stand behind a table, with a folded fan and a gavel (serving as a prop to strike the table as a warning to the audience to be quiet or as a means of attracting attention in order to strengthen the effect of the performance, especially at the beginning or during intervals). They often add their own commentaries on the subjects and the characters in their storytelling. In this way, the audience, while watching their performances, is not only entertained, but also educated and enlightened. Travelers in Beijing will often find taxi drivers listening to it on the radio.

Pingshu is popular in North and most of Northeast China. The art of storytelling, with its broad mass appeal, has resulted in the growth of other art forms, nurturing talented artists. Many great writers, in consequence, continued from there to tread the path of literature.

In order to attract the new generation of listeners, some non-traditional content was also adopted as Pingshu, like Harry Potter.

See also
Audiobook
Radio drama
Rakugo

References 

Chinese storytelling